Cuissy Abbey was a Premonstratensian abbey in France in the diocese of Soissons, and was among the earliest foundations of the Premonstratensian Order.

History
The abbey was situated at Cuissy-et-Geny, near Laon, in the département of Aisne.

It was founded in 1118 by Luc de Roucy, canon and dean of Laon, who withdrew there with a few disciples.

In 1122, the community joined the Premonstratensian order of canons regular which had just been founded by Norbert of Xanten, and a house of which had been set up in Laon with the support of the bishop. The community was raised to the status of an abbey in 1124, with Luc as the first abbot.

As one of the earliest Premonstratensian abbeys, Cuissy, along with the Abbey of St. Martin, Laon, and Floreffe Abbey, was one of the primarii inter pares, or senior houses of the order.

Cuissy developed a reputation for exceptionally fine calligraphy and manuscript illumination.

The church and monastic premises were almost entirely rebuilt in 1746, apparently leaving no medieval structures.

The abbey was dissolved in 1790 during the French Revolution, and the site, after some use for industrial purposes, was abandoned. Some surviving structures from the 17th and 18th centuries have been classed as historical monuments since 1928.

Notes

References
 Catholic Encyclopedia: Soissons
  Persée : Histoire et architecture de l'Abbaye de Cuissy aux XVIIe et XVIIIe siècles, Martine Plouvier, 1976

Premonstratensian monasteries in France
Religious organizations established in the 1110s
1118 establishments in Europe
1110s establishments in France
Monasteries in Aisne
Christian monasteries established in the 12th century
1790s disestablishments in France